The following is a list of massacres that have occurred in Egypt (numbers may be approximate):

Notes

References

Egypt
Massacres

Massacres